Brachycerasphora is a genus of dwarf spiders that was first described by J. Denis in 1962.

Species
 it contains five species:
Brachycerasphora connectens Denis, 1964 – Libya
Brachycerasphora convexa (Simon, 1884) – Algeria, Tunisia, Israel
Brachycerasphora femoralis (O. Pickard-Cambridge, 1872) – Israel
Brachycerasphora monocerotum Denis, 1962 (type) – Libya
Brachycerasphora parvicornis (Simon, 1884) – Egypt, Israel

See also
 List of Linyphiidae species

References

Araneomorphae genera
Linyphiidae
Spiders of Africa
Spiders of Asia